Connie Chan (born October 3, 1978) is an American politician serving as a member of the San Francisco Board of Supervisors for District 1 since January 8, 2021, after defeating Marjan Philhour, who ran for the seat in 2016, in a narrow race. Chan is generally considered a progressive.

Early life and education 
Chan was born in Hong Kong and migrated to San Francisco at the age of thirteen with her mother and brother. She earned a bachelor's degree from the University of California, Davis. After graduating from college, Chan participated in various forms of social activism, serving as a community organizer in a youth center, and working in a legal outreach program. She worked for the San Francisco Recreation & Parks Department. In 2006, Chan was recruited to be an aide to Supervisor Sophie Maxwell and later served as an aide to then-District Attorney Kamala Harris, followed by Supervisor Aaron Peskin in 2016.

San Francisco Board of Supervisors 
After incumbent Supervisor Sandra Lee Fewer announced she would not seek re-election, Chan announced her candidacy for the seat. In the November 3rd General Election, Chan won by 134 votes against challenger Marjan Philhour. She was sworn into office on January 8, 2021.

Upon assuming office, she supported legislation by Supervisor Dean Preston to create a city-run public bank.  Chan has voiced her support for redirecting some police resources to public health, schools, and other city services. In Late February 2021, Chan supported a plan to provide free Summer Activities for San Francisco's elementary school students. 

After being sworn in, Chan joined other supervisors in calling for an investigation of the San Francisco Parks Alliance, as part of a debate on whether to keep a large ferris wheel at Golden Gate Park.
Chan and fellow Supervisor Aaron Peskin blocked a decision by the San Francisco Historic Preservation Commission to extend the wheel's stay through 2025, referring it to a vote in the Board of Supervisors. Instead of the Commission's proposal, Chan and Peskin proposed to allow for the wheel to remain in place until February 2022, citing complaints from opponents regarding bright lights and the wheel’s electric generator, which they said harms the park’s wildlife, as well as the wheel's ties to the nonprofit San Francisco Parks Alliance which is linked to the city's ongoing corruption scandal. Their proposition was denied by the Board of Supervisors in a 6–5 vote.

In 2021, Chan supported the reopening of the Great Highway for cars, which had been temporarily closed down during the COVID-19 pandemic and turned into a walkway.

Positions on housing 
Chan has expressed support for building more dense housing and expanding construction of affordable housing while also arguing that construction of more market-rate housing does not make housing more affordable and voting against mixed housing construction projects that expand both market-rate housing and affordable housing. In 2022, Chan prevented the Board of Supervisors from considering a proposed referendum that would streamline the permitting process for certain housing developments – permitting times in San Francisco for housing are substantially lengthier than in similar localities. San Francisco mayor London Breed described the vote as "obstructionism."

In 2021, Chan blocked the development of 495-unit apartment complex (one-quarter of which were designated as affordable housing) on a Nordstroms valet parking lot next to a BART station.

Personal life 
Chan's long time partner, Ed, is a member of the San Francisco Fire Department. The couple has a son.

References 

Hong Kong emigrants to the United States
1978 births
Living people
University of California, Davis alumni
21st-century American women